Best of Grim Reaper is a compilation album by Grim Reaper. The songs are drawn from Grim Reaper's singles and albums.

Track listing
 "See You in Hell"  (Bowcott, Grimmett)  4:17
 "Fear No Evil"  (Bowcott, Grimmett)  4:01
 "Rock You to Hell"  (Bowcott, Grimmett)  4:02
 "Wrath of the Reaper"  (Bowcott, Grimmett)  3:13
 "Lust for Freedom"  (Bowcott, Grimmett)  4:27
 "Never Coming Back"  (Bowcott, Grimmett)  3:35
 "All Hell Let Loose"  (Bowcott, Grimmett)  4:24
 "The Show Must Go On"  (Bowcott, DeMercado)  7:27
 "Let the Thunder Roar"  (Bowcott, Grimmett)  4:08
 "Run for Your Life"  (Bowcott, Grimmett)  3:40
 "Waysted Love"  (Bowcott, DeMercado)  4:19
 "Now or Never"  (Bowcott, Grimmett)  2:52
 "Fight for the Last"  (Bowcott, Grimmett)  2:59
 "Dead on Arrival"  (Bowcott, Grimmett)  4:32
 "Lay It on the Line"  (Bowcott, Grimmett)  4:07
 "Suck It and See"  (Bowcott, Grimmett)  2:32
 "Final Scream"  (Bowcott, Grimmett)  5:28

References

1999 greatest hits albums
Grim Reaper (band) albums
New Wave of British Heavy Metal compilation albums